Cypros (1st-century) was a queen consort of Judea. She was married to king Herod Agrippa.

Life
She was born to Phasael II and Salampsio and the granddaughter of Phasael, brother of Herod the Great.

She married Herod Agrippa after he returned from having spent his childhood in Rome.

By the help of Herodias, she convinced Herod Antipas to appoint Herod Agrippa as governor in Tiberias in Galileen.

When Agrippa and Antipas became involved in conflict and Agrippa wished to return to Rome, Cypros successfully negotiated a loan from the banker Alexander de Alabarch of Alexandria to finance his exile.

Issue
Herod Agrippa II [b. AD 27/28?-d. 93?] became the eighth and final ruler from the Herodian family, but without any control of Judea. He supported Roman Rule and died childless.
Berenice [b. AD 28-after 81], who first married Marcus Julius Alexander, son of Alexander the Alabarch around AD 41. After Marcus Julius died [AD 44], she married her uncle Herod of Chalcis by whom she had two sons, Berenicianus and Hyrcanus. She later lived with her brother Agrippa II, reputedly in an incestuous relationship. Finally, she married Polemon, king of Cilicia as alluded to by Juvenal. Berenice also had a common law relationship with the Roman emperor Titus. Similar to her brother Herod Agrippa II, she supported Roman Rule.
Drusus [b.?-d.?] According to Josephus, there was also a younger brother called Drusus, who died before his teens.
Mariamne [b. 34/35-], who married Julius Archelaus, son of Chelcias AD 49/50; they had a daughter Berenice (daughter of Mariamne) [b. AD 50] who lived with her mother in Alexandria, Egypt after her parents' divorce. Around AD 65 Mariamne left her husband and married Demetrius of Alexandria who was its Alabarch and had a son from him named Agrippinus.
Drusilla [AD 38–79], who married first to Gaius Julius Azizus, King of Emesa and then to Antonius Felix, the procurator of Judaea. Drusilla and her son Marcus Antonius Agrippa died in Pompeii during the eruption of Vesuvius. A daughter, Antonia Clementiana, became a grandmother to a Lucius Anneius Domitius Proculus. Two possible descendants from this marriage are Marcus Antonius Fronto Salvianus (a quaestor) and his son Marcus Antonius Felix Magnus, a high priest in 225.

References

Herodian dynasty
1st-century women
1st-century deaths
Ancient princesses
Ancient Jewish women
Ancient queens consort